Margaret of Flanders (died 3 July 1285) was a Duchess consort of Brabant. She was the daughter of Guy of Dampierre and his first wife Matilda of Béthune.

She married John I, Duke of Brabant in 1273. She was the mother of:
 Godfrey (1273/74 – aft. 13 September 1283).
 John II of Brabant (1275–1312).
 Margaret of Brabant (4 October 1276 – 14 December 1311, Genoa), married 9 June 1292 to Henry VII, Holy Roman Emperor.
 Marie (d. after 2 December 1338), married to Count Amadeus V of Savoy.

References

1285 deaths
Margaret
Margaret
Duchesses of Limburg
1251 births
13th-century French people
13th-century French women